Sheikh Hafiz Haji Hasan-al-Maroof Sultan Manghopir or Pir Mangho (Sindhi and Urdu: خواجہ حسن سخی سلطان عرف منگھو پیر ) is the popular name for 13th century Sufi Pir Haji Syed Khawaja Hassan Sakhi Sultan. Sakhi Sultan Manghopir's proper name is Hasan and according to another version Kamaluddin. He was titled a pir by Baba Farid, whose disciple he became. Pir Mangho Urs is celebrated in the Islamic month of Zil Hijjah. The settlement around his shrine has been named Manghopir and is part of Gadap Town in Karachi, Sindh, Pakistan. 

Balochis often call this place as 'Mangi' or Garm-aap / Sard-aap (due to the presence of the hot & cold springs).

Background
Originally, he was an Arab and a descendant of Ali ibn Abi Talib. He is a Hassani (descendants of Hasan ibn Ali) from the mother's side and Husaini (descendant of Hussain ibn Ali from father's side. He came to India from Hijaz in the 13th century AD. That was the time of the Tartar's invasion of Muslim lands which created great havoc. He participated in the jihad against them. Then he performed the Hajj, and while he was in Medina, he had a vision of Muhammad who directed him to go to Ajudhan (present day Pak Patan) and meet the Sufi saint Fariduddin Ganjshakar. He then went, to Ajudhan and presented himself to Sheikh Ganj Shakhar. In 662 AH (1263 or 1264 AD), he was admitted as a disciple in the Chistiah order, and he became the 40th Khalifah/Caliph of Baba Farid Ganjshakar. Based on the advice of Baba Farid, he went to Multan in 659 AH (1260 or 1261 AD). From there, he travelled to various places in the pursuit of spiritual attainment and then settled down in Manghopir where he carried out his missionary work.

Manghopir was a desolate place then; there he spent his days in prayer and seeking spiritual attainments. In ancient times this place is reported to have been the sacred place of the Hindus. With the presence of this saint at Manghopir, it became an attraction for the seekers of Oneness and Truth. Great luminaries of the spiritual world, such as Bahauddin Zakariya, Lal Shahbaz Qalander, Jalaluddin Bokhari often visited Manghopir.

The ancient texts from the area mention this shrine and it is also mentioned in the writings of 19th century British colonialists. Some historians say that the crocodiles at the shrine's pond have been here for centuries.

Crocodiles 
The crocodiles are an integral part of the shrine and are so tightly interwoven with the story of the saint that it is almost impossible to judge between fact & fiction. There are many traditions about myth of crocodiles, as if it is believed that Baba Farid gave the reptiles to Manghopir. According to scientific explanations, these crocodiles were carried through some heavy floods, during ancient times and later gathered or collected at this pond. Archaeological investigations have also found the existence of a Bronze Age settlement (2500-1700 BC) at Manghopir, who worshipped crocodiles.
This shrine has a very large pond and a sulphur spring. The pond has dozens of crocodiles who are regularly and traditionally fed by visitors to the shrine.

Hot springs and healing resort 
There are hot and cold springs about a kilometer from the shrine. Warm water passing through the sulphur rocks is said to have some medicinal qualities. Many people with skin diseases regularly come from long distances to have a bath to cure them. There are separate swimming pools and shower rooms for men and women. Scientific analysis has shown that this warm water is naturally saturated with carbon dioxide, besides containing some sulphur which is considered good for treating some skin diseases.

Pir Mangho Urs
Pir Mangho Urs is an annual festival (urs) at the shrine of Sufi Pir Mangho at Karachi, Sindh, Pakistan. The urs marks the death anniversary of Pir Mangho and is held annually in the Islamic month of Dhu al-Hijjah. The Urs is entirely separate from the more widely known Sheedi Mela that is also held at the Manghopir shrine.

See also
 Islam Pir
 Urs
 Manghopir
 Manghopir Hills
 Manghopir Urs
 Sheedi
 Sheedi Mela
 Abdullah Shah Ghazi
 Ayub Shah Bukhari

References

External links

Sindhi Sufi saints
History of Sindh
Sindhi people
People from Karachi
Hot springs of Pakistan
Sufi shrines in Pakistan
Sufis of Sindh